Derry GAA honours contains details of the achievements of Derry inter-county teams in the Gaelic games of Gaelic football, hurling, ladies' Gaelic football and camogie. It also where possible, lists the Derry team for each winning final.

Gaelic football

Senior
All-Ireland Senior Football Championship: 1
1993

National Football League Championship: 6
1947, 1992, 1995, 1996, 2000, 2008

Ulster Senior Football Championship: 7
1958, 1970, 1975, 1976, 1987, 1993, 1998

Dr McKenna Cup: 10
1947, 1954, 1958, 1960, 1969, 1970, 1971, 1974, 1993, 1999

Dr Lagan Cup: 6
1945, 1947, 1950, 1953, 1959, 1961

Ulster Junior Football Championship: 7
1945, 1950, 1953, 1955, 1964, 1967, 1969

Under 21
All-Ireland Under-21 Football Championship: 2
1968, 1997

Ulster Under-21 Football Championship: 7
1967, 1968, 1976, 1983, 1986, 1993, 1997

Minor
All-Ireland Minor Football Championship: 4
1965, 1983, 1989, 2002

Ulster Minor Football Championship: 14
1965, 1969, 1970, 1980, 1981, 1983, 1984, 1986, 1989, 1990, 1995, 2000, 2002, 2020

School
All-Ireland Vocational Schools Championship: 3
1979, 1980, 1981

Ulster Vocational Schools Championship: ?
?

Players' honours

Footballer of the Year
Two Derry players have been awarded the Texaco Footballer of the Year award. Ballymaguigan's Jim McKeever won the inaugural award in 1958, while Henry Downey of the Lavey club received player of the year for his performances in helping Derry win the 1993 All-Ireland Senior Football Championship.

1958: Jim McKeever
1993: Henry Downey

All Stars
Since the 1960s there has been a tradition of annually selecting the best footballer in each position, to create a special team of the year. Between 1963 and 1967 these players received what was known as Cú Chulainn awards. In 1971 these awards were formalised into the annual All Star Awards. Including Sean O'Connell's Cú Chulainn award in 1967, Derry have received 28 All Stars.

1967: Sean O'Connell
1973: Anthony McGurk
1975: Peter Stevenson, Anthony McGurk, Gerry McElhinney
1984: Dermot McNicholl
1987: Tony Scullion, Brian McGilligan
1992: Tony Scullion, Anthony Tohill, Enda Gormley
1993: Tony Scullion, Johnny McGurk, Henry Downey, Gary Coleman, Anthony Tohill, Brian McGilligan, Enda Gormley
1995: Tony Scullion, Anthony Tohill
1996: Joe Brolly
1997: Joe Brolly
1998: Seán Marty Lockhart
2000: Kieran McKeever, Anthony Tohill
2004: Enda Muldoon
2007: Kevin McCloy, Paddy Bradley

A.  Cú Chulainn Award

GPA Gaelic Football Team of the Year
Since 2006 the Gaelic Players Association have chosen their own team of the year.

2007: Paddy Bradley

International Rules representatives
A number of Derry players have been selected to play International rules football for the Ireland team against Australia; both in the test games (1984, 1986, 1987 and 1990) and since the commencement of the International Rules Series in 1998. Note the table is incomplete.

Hurling

Senior

Nicky Rackard Cup: 1
2006

All-Ireland 'B' Senior Hurling Championship: 1
1996

Ulster Senior Hurling Championship: 4
1902/3?, 1908, 2000, 2001.

All-Ireland Junior Hurling Championship: (2)
1975, 1982

Ulster Intermediate Hurling Championship: (1)
1997

Ulster Junior Hurling Championship: (3/4?)
1974, 1975, 1984, 1997??

Under 21
Ulster Under-21 Hurling Championship: 6
1986, 1987, 1993, 1997, 2007, 2008

Minor
Ulster Minor Hurling Championship: 9
1973/4?, 1979, 1980, 1981, 1982, 1983, 1990, 1991, 2001.

Camogie

Senior
Ulster Senior Camogie Championships: 8
1954, 1989, 1990, 1999, 2001, 2003, 2004, 2006

Ulster Junior Camogie Championships: 12
1960, 1967, 1969, 1978, 1986, 1998, 1999, 2000, 2001, 2002, 2006, 2007

Minor
Ulster Minor Camogie Championships: 9
1990, 1994, 1995, 1998, 1999, 2000, 2001, 2002, 2003

Notes:
The above list of honours may be incomplete. Please add any other honours you know of.
B.  The team listed for winning the 1954 Ulster Championship is actually the team that played Dublin in the 1954 All-Ireland final, it is likely the same or very similar to the team that beat Antrim in that year's Ulster final.
Source for the camogie team lineups:

Players' honours

All Stars
The Camogie All Star Awards were first introduced in 2004 and Aisling Diamond of Bellaghy won became the first winner from Derry in 2007.

2007: Aisling Diamond

References

External links
Official Derry GAA website
Derry on Hogan Stand
National and provincial titles won by Derry football and hurling teams

Honours